Chryseobacterium wanjuense  is a bacterium from the genus of Chryseobacterium which has been isolated from greenhouse soil, which was cultivated with Lactuca sativa, in the Wanju Province in Korea.

References

Further reading

External links
Type strain of Chryseobacterium wanjuense at BacDive -  the Bacterial Diversity Metadatabase

wanjuense
Bacteria described in 2006